Barbara Szemán-Tóth (born 11 February 1993) is a Hungarian footballer who plays as a defender for MTK and the Hungary women's national team.

Career
Szemán-Tóth is a member of the Hungary senior national team. She made her debut for the team on 1 March 2019 against Italy, coming on as a substitute for Alexandra Tóth.

Personal life
She is married to Lajos Szemán, who is also a footballer. Their wedding had to be postponed due to both Szemán and Tóth picking up injuries while playing football on the same weekend.

References

1993 births
Living people
Women's association football defenders
Hungarian women's footballers
Hungary women's international footballers
MTK Hungária FC (women) players